Baião may refer to:
Baião (music)
Baião, Portugal, a municipality in northern Portugal
Baião, Pará, Brazil